Nika Georgievna Turbina (17 December 1974, Yalta – 11 May 2002, Moscow) was a Russian poet. She became famous for her profound and emotional poems which she wrote at an early age.

She wrote her first poem at the very young age of four and started writing poetry at the age of six and at the age of 10, her first poetry collection First Draft was published. She was awarded the Golden Lion for her poems in 1985. She wrote several poetry collections during her short career.

Biography

Career
She started writing poetry at the age of 6 and published her first book in 1984, at the age of 10.  A recording of her recitations sold over 30,000 copies in the then Soviet Union.

Turbina wrote her first complete poem at age of 4. Two years later, she was discovered by writer Yulian Semyonov who spent part of the year in her hometown of Yalta. Turbina's talent set her apart from her classmates in school, where she was learning ahead of her grade. She studied the piano and her favorite subject was mathematics, which she saw as akin to verses.

At the age of 10, Turbina published her first book, First Draft, with an introduction by  Yevgeny Yevtushenko in 1984. Translations of her First Draft have been published in France, Italy and Britain.

Death
She died on 11 May 2002 in Moscow, Russia at the age of 27 after she fell from her 5th floor window. Nika Turbina was buried at Vagankovo Cemetery in Moscow.

Legacy
Turbina was the subject of the movie Nika, a biographical film by director Vasilisa Kuzmina starring Elizaveta Yankovskaya which had its world premiere at the 2022 South by Southwest festival.

Books 
 Quaderno di appunti, 1984.
 First Draft, 1988.
 Stupenʹki vverkh, stupenʹki vniz (Steps Upwards, Steps Downwards), 1991.
 Not To Forget, 2004.
 Sono pesi queste mie poesie, 2008.
 Nika Turbina, 2018.

See also
 Nadya Rusheva
 Sasha Putrya
 Nika (film)

References

External links
 Italian and English translations of her poetry and some official biographical notes
 A few English translations of her poetry translated by Ljubov V. Kuchkina
 Website dedicated to Nika Turbina on library.ru
 Project dedicated to memory of Nika (Russian)
 Website (Russian)
 Her first book (Russian)
 Her second book (Russian)

1974 births
2002 suicides
People from Yalta
Ukrainian poets in Russian
Child writers
Burials at Vagankovo Cemetery
Soviet women poets
Russian women poets
20th-century Russian poets
21st-century Russian poets
Suicides by jumping in Russia
Russian-language poets
21st-century Russian women writers
2002 deaths
20th-century Russian women writers